Stoppel Point is a mountain located in Greene County, New York northeast of Haines Falls, New York. Located to the southeast is North Mountain. Stoppel Point drains east into Winter Clove, north into Countryman Kill and East Kill, and the east side is the source of Kaaterskill Creek.

References

Mountains of Greene County, New York
Mountains of New York (state)